La Llera is one of 41 parishes (administrative divisions) in Villaviciosa, a municipality within the province and autonomous community of Asturias, in northern Spain. 

References  

Parishes in Villaviciosa

ast:La Llera